Turtle Lake may refer to:

Canada
 Turtle Lake (Temagami), in Ontario
 Turtle Lake (Saskatchewan)
 Turtle Lake Monster, cryptid that allegedly lives in the lake
 Turtle Lake (Vancouver Island)

Georgia
 Turtle Lake (Tbilisi), or "Kus Tba"

United States
 Turtle Lake (Beltrami County, Minnesota)
 Turtle Lake (Cass County, Minnesota)
 Turtle Lake (Douglas County, Minnesota)
 Turtle Lake (Grant County, Minnesota)
 Turtle Lake (Polk County, Minnesota)
 Turtle Lake Township, Beltrami County, Minnesota
 Turtle Lake Township, Cass County, Minnesota
 Turtle Lake, Shoreview, Minnesota
 Turtle Lake Elementary School, Shoreview, Minnesota
 Turtle Lake, Montana
 Turtle Lake, North Dakota
 Turtle Lake, Wisconsin, a village
 Turtle Lake, Barron County, Wisconsin, a town
 Turtle Lake, Walworth County, Wisconsin, a CDP